Haaslava Parish was a rural municipality in Tartu County (Estonia), located southeast from the city of Tartu.

Administrative center was in Kurepalu village.

From the north the parish was bordered by river Emajõgi. From southwest by Tartu–Pechory railway line.

In 2017 the parish was merged into Kastre Parish.

Settlements
Small borough
Roiu

Villages
Aadami - Aardla - Aardlapalu - Alaküla - Haaslava - Igevere - Ignase - Kitseküla - Kõivuküla - Koke - Kriimani - Kurepalu - Lange - Metsanurga - Mõra - Päkste - Paluküla - Tõõraste - Uniküla

Gallery

Twinnings
 Leivonmäki, Finland

References

External links

Municipalities of Estonia
Populated places in Tartu County
Former municipalities of Estonia